Geetha Govindam is an Indian Malayalam-language soap opera. The show premiered on 13 February 2023 on Asianet and aires on-demand through Disney+Hotstar. It stars Sajan Surya and Binny Sebastian in lead roles along with Shwetha Venkat, Revathi Nair, Uma Nair, Amrutha Nair in pivotal roles.

Synopsis
A middle-aged businessman Govind, falls in love with Geethanjali, a young girl. Their unusual love story takes a hit when his past overshadows his present.

Cast

Main
Sajan Surya as Arakkal Govind Madhav
 Dr. Binny Sebastian as Geethanjali

Recurring
 Shwetha Venkat as Radhika
 Revathi Nair as Priya
 Aju Thomas as Varun
 Uma Nair
 Amrutha Nair
 Akin as Kishor
 Anil K Sivaram as Ayyappan Nair
 Santhosh Kurup as Bhadran

Guest
Santhosh Keezhattoor as Arakkal Madhavan
Asif Ali as himself

References

External links
 Official website 

Indian drama television series
Indian television soap operas
Indian television series
Malayalam-language television shows
2023 Indian television series debuts